Cova d'en Daina is a dolmen located near Romanyà de la Selva, in the municipality of Santa Cristina d'Aro, Catalonia, Spain.

Description
It was discovered by Pere Cama i Casas and the first mention of its uncovering was by Agustí Casas in 1894. It was later excavated by Lluís Esteva Cruañas, who unearthed human bones and teeth, flint arrowheads, knife and pottery fragments and necklace beads. It was partially reconstructed in the 1950s. It is seven metres long and made up of an entrance passage into the funeral chamber, with a circular tumulus that is 10 metres in diameter. The entrance to the tomb is oriented to the southeast, which allows sunlight to reach the interior on the winter solstice.

Gallery

References

External links
 Cova d'en Daina description

Archaeological sites in Catalonia
Dolmens in Spain
Baix Empordà
History of Catalonia
3rd-millennium BC architecture
Bronze Age sites in Europe